Mellunmäki metro station is the ground-level terminus station on the M2 line of the Helsinki Metro. It serves the district of Mellunmäki in East Helsinki.

The station was opened on 1 September 1989 and was designed by architect bureau Toivo Karhunen Oy. It is located 1.6 kilometres east of Kontula.

The Mellunmäki metro station is the northernmost metro station in the world.

Pictures

References

External links

Helsinki Metro stations
Railway stations opened in 1989
1989 establishments in Finland